Thalberg or Talberg is a surname of German origin, which means "valley hill". It may refer to:

Irving Thalberg (1899–1936), American film producer
Irving Thalberg Jr. (1930–1988), American philosopher
Norma Thalberg (1902–1983), Canadian actress
Ole Talberg (born 1982), Norwegian football player
Ruben Talberg (born 1964), German artist
Sigismond Thalberg (1812–1871), Austrian composer
Zare Thalberg (1858–1915), English opera soprano and actress

Other uses
Burg Thalberg, a castle in Styria, Austria
Irving G. Thalberg Memorial Award
Schlag bei Thalberg, a municipality in Styria, Austria

See also
Tallberg

German-language surnames
Jewish surnames